Rahmat Saleh Baloch is a Pakistani politician who was a Member of the Provincial Assembly of Balochistan, from May 2013 to May 2018.

Early life and education

He was born on 1 January 1975 in Panjgur District.

He has received a degree in Bachelor of Science from Degree College Panjgur in 1997.

Political career
He was elected to the Provincial Assembly of Balochistan in 2002 Pakistani general election.

He was re-elected to the Provincial Assembly of Balochistan as a candidate of National Party from Constituency PB-42 Panjgoor-I in 2013 Pakistani general election.

References

Balochistan MPAs 2013–2018

Living people
1975 births